Pichugino is a rural locality (a village) in Danilovskoye Rural Settlement, Melenkovsky District, Vladimir Oblast, Russia. The population was 75 as of 2010.

Geography 
Pichugino is located on the Charmus River, 33 km west of Melenki (the district's administrative centre) by road. Kamenka is the nearest rural locality.

References 

Rural localities in Melenkovsky District